The Cramps was an American punk rock band from New York City. Formed in April 1976, the group originally consisted of vocalist Lux Interior (Erick Purkhiser), guitarists Poison Ivy (Kristy Wallace) and Bryan Gregory (Gregory Beckerleg), and drummer Pam Balam (Pam Beckerleg). The band remained active until Purkhiser's death on February 4, 2009, when its lineup featured Wallace and drummer Harry Drumdini (Harry Meisenheimer).

History

1976–1986
Lux Interior, Poison Ivy, Bryan Gregory and Pam Balam (Gregory's sister) formed the Cramps in April 1976. After just a few months, Balam was replaced by Miriam Linna. She remained in the group until shortly after its first headlining show in July 1977, when Nick Knox (Nick Stephanoff) took her place. After releasing three singles and a debut album, Songs the Lord Taught Us, Gregory left the Cramps at the end of May 1980 following a show in Berkeley, California. He was briefly replaced during the summer of 1980 by Julien Griensnatch (Julien Hechtlinger), before Kid Congo Powers (Brian Tristan) took over before the end of the year.

Powers contributed to 1981's Psychedelic Jungle and the 1983 live album Smell of Female, before rejoining the Gun Club that September. He was replaced for shows over the next year by Ike Knox (Mike Metoff) and Click Mort (Christopher Doran). Starting in 1985, the Cramps began adding bass to its recordings, starting with "Surfin' Dead" on the soundtrack for the film The Return of the Living Dead – initially, the role was performed by Poison Ivy, including on the band's 1986 return A Date with Elvis. For the subsequent promotional tour, Jennifer "Fur" Dixon briefly joined the band, followed by Candy del Mar starting in the summer.

1986–2009
With the lineup of Lux Interior, Poison Ivy, Candy del Mar and Nick Knox, the Cramps released RockinnReelininAucklandNewZealandXXX in 1987 and Stay Sick! in 1990, before both del Mar and Knox left in early 1991. In the summer, the group recorded Look Mom No Head! with new bassist Slim Chance and drummer Jim Sclavunos (formerly of Sonic Youth), although by the time the album was released, the latter had been replaced by former Weirdos and L.A. Guns drummer Nickey Alexander (Jeffrey Ivisovich). By early 1993, Alexander had also left the band, replaced by False Confession's Harry Drumdini (Harry Meisenheimer).

After two more albums – 1994's Flamejob and 1997's Big Beat from Badsville – and an extensive touring cycle, Slim Chance left the Cramps towards the end of 1998. For tour dates at the end of the year, and occasional performances during 1999 and 2000, bass was performed by Doran Shelley and later Sugarpie Jones (Tim Ferris). The group remained inactive for much of 2001 and 2002, before announcing in August 2002 that it had started recording a new album with new permanent bassist Scott "Chopper" Franklin. The album, Fiends of Dope Island, was released in April 2003. Drumdini was fired in the summer due to problems with alcohol abuse, with "Jungle" Jim Chandler stepping in for dates later in the year.

Following the release of How to Make a Monster, a compilation of old demo recordings, the Cramps toured with new drummer Bill "Buster" Bateman starting in the summer of 2004. After another hiatus, the group toured in August 2006 with Harry Drumdini returning on drums, before Franklin was replaced in October and November by Sean Yseult (Shauna Reynolds). During 2007 and 2008, the Cramps remained inactive again, before it was announced that frontman Lux Interior had died on February 4, 2009, of aortic dissection, thus signalling the end of the band.

Members

Timeline

Lineups

References

Footnotes

Cramps, The